National Lampoon's Doon is a parody of Frank Herbert's 1965 science fiction novel Dune, written by Ellis Weiner and published in 1984 by Pocket Books for National Lampoon. It was reprinted by Grafton Books in 1985. In 1988 William F. Touponce called the book "something of a tribute to Herbert's success on college campuses", noting that "the only other book to have been so honored is Tolkien's The Lord of the Rings," which was parodied by The Harvard Lampoon in 1969.

Dune is set on the dangerous, sandworm-ridden desert planet Arrakis, sole source of the spice melange, the most valuable substance in the universe. The parody follows a similar storyline, wherein rival restaurant-owning families battle for control of Arruckus, which is overrun by giant pretzels and the source of valuable beer.

Plot 

Within the Galactic Empire, a change of fief is occurring. Led by the verbose Baron Vladimir, House Hardchargin, the Great Big House given charge of Arruckus, has been displaced by Shaddap IV, the Padedbrah Emperor, in favor of the up-and-coming House Agamemnides, with Duke Lotto at its head.

Arruckus is also known as "Doon", and is additionally known as the Dessert Planet. Covered entirely in sugars, it is a harsh unforgiving environment, where not an entree can be found; the natives live entirely on whatever they can import, produce from the sugars, or produce from soy protein (the native food experiments known as the Mahn t'Vani)

Duke Lotto accepts the fief, aware that it may well be a death trap but also conscious of the importance of Arruckus's only export, the wide-spectrum intoxicant known as beer. Found naturally on Arruckus as a result of natural processes and nowhere else, it is the engine on which commerce runs; the Schlepping Guild, who has a monopoly on space travel in the Imperium, will not run without it. Who controls the beer controls commerce.

But soon after arriving on Doon, with his heir and son Pall and his concubine the Lady Jazzica, an adept of the galaxy-spanning sisterhood of chefs and event planners known as the Boni Maroni, Duke Lotto and House Agamemnides fall victim to a scheme originated by Baron Vladimir Hardchargin and implemented by the Duke's own accountant Oyeah, who, without the Duke's knowledge, kept a secret second ledger. When the Emperor called for an audit of the fief, the duplicate ledger made it appear as though House Agamemnides had been cooking the books. In return for this act, Oyeah hoped the Baron would give him a start as a stand-up comic–which he did, but on the Imperial prison planet, Salacia Simplicissimus. Ruined, Duke Lotto's brief reign over Doon is ended and House Hardchargin is reinstated as fief-holders.

Banished to the sugared wilderness, Pall (now head of House Agamemnides) and Lady Jazzica meet with and are eventually accepted by the planet's native population, the Freedmenmen, a process made easier by previous prophecy-seeding by the Missionaria Phonibalonica, via the Great Prophet Phyllis. The natives are receptive to the fulfillment of the prophecies even after the revelation that Phyllis's decanonization resulted in her prophecies being discredited. Pall, given the Freedmenmen name Assol and taking the secret name Mauve'Bib (after the purple napkin that all Freedmenmen wear about their necks), begins to ascend the power structure of the tribe and takes the Freedmenmen girl Loni as his lover. He realizes that he could use the Freedmenmen to return to a position of power, taking control of not only Doon but the Imperium itself. He also realizes what the planet's Imperial Planetologist and liberal economist, Keynes, had puzzled out some time before: the rampaging Giant Pretzels (known as Schmai-gunug) actually produces the beer as a byproduct of its very life-cycle. The Lady Jazzica ascends to the status of Revved-Up Mother of Hootch Grabr, becoming known as Jazzica-of-the-Weirdness. During her ascension, while getting drunk on the beer, she realizes that she carries Lotto's daughter. Her intoxication opens her foetal daughter to the thousands of years of Boni Maroni culinary history; the result is Nailya-the-Truly-Weird, a toddler who spouts recipes as though she were an adult.

Pall positions himself as the Kumquat Haagendasz (the result of a generations-long breeding program so secret that the Boni Maroni have actually forgotten the point) and the Mahdl-t, the long hoped-for Freedmenmen messiah, "he who will drive us to Paradise and Back", who will finally bring the entrees the Freedmenmen have hungered for. By this route, he assumes and consolidates his power over the natives, not only making them his allies, but his fanatic followers.

Meanwhile, Baron Vladimir Hardchargin has his own problems. Converting the fief into the Shadvlad Rendezvous, the galaxy's premier lounge planet, is a relative success, even though the Freedmenmen remain a chronic problem and the Giant Pretzels remain at large. He is hungry for more success, and has plans to muscle out his silent partner (the Emperor) and play the Imperial House against the Boni Moroni, the Schlepping Guild, and the interstellar development cooperative NOAMCHOMSKI using his control of beer as leverage, thereby becoming the true power in the galaxy, and franchising the Shadvlad across the Imperium.

Events come to a head when Pall, gone completely native and acquiring the "Eye of the Egad" (the telltale red-on-red eyes, indicating severe beer addiction) challenges the Baron to a bake-off, with a new ingredient: peanut butter, rendered from the naturally occurring snack mix's peanuts, and debuting his secret weapon – a liqueur made from beer – Drambrewski. With the support of the Boni Moroni, the promise of an assured supply of beer to the Schlepping Guild (who had been influenced to believe that the Hardchargins have been watering the beer, and are revealed to have the red-on-red eyes of beer addiction), and after dispatching the ShaNaNa-Baron Flip-Rotha Hardchargin in rankout (single insult-combat), Pall assumes Imperial control, banishing the Emperor's house to the prison planet Simplicissima Secundus, acquiring the hand of the Emperor's daughter Serutan in a marriage of convenience, and the Freedmenmen woman Loni as his concubine.

Comedic style 

The story uses a style typical to many parodies and spoofs of the genre, most notably Bored of the Rings, encompassing not only high and sometimes abstruse humor but middle and low as well, through punning references and plays on words designed to either make light of the original characters' names or referring to pop-culture touchpoints.

For example, the galactic development combine CHOAM in the original Dune story becomes NOAMCHOMSKI, an acronym which expands to the name Neutralis Organizational Abba Mercantile Condominium Havatampa Orthonovum Minnehaha Shostakovich Kategorial Imperative – a name whose style mocks that of the equally-impenetrable Combine Honnete Ober Advancer Mercantiles – and is mentioned and expanded on by some characters to the point of compulsion. The Bene Gesserit litany against fear becomes the litany against fun: I must not have fun. Fun is the time-killer.

Another example is the repeated use of the name Jonzun Fillup, the acclaimed architect from whose designs the Baron Hardchargin cribs liberally to create the Shadvlad. This is a reference to Philip Johnson, the influential 20th Century American architect whose controversial postmodern design for the then-AT&T Building included a top reminiscent of a Chippendale bookcase. This too is transferred to the story, as Baron Hardchargin lavishly praises Fillup's Gothic entablature at the north pole of the Antares Teleport and Telepath's headquarters planet.

Other references, such as the word Mahn-t'vani (a play on the easy-listening music composer Mantovani) and the name Serutan (with reference to its famous "Serutan spelled backwards is "natures"" tagline) may seem a bit dated, but there are references to such things as the hokey-pokey and Tito Puente which still hold currency in modern culture.

Overall, the arc of the story is respected and held closely to throughout. In the style of the original, quotes from the Princess Serutan's works (amongst them, The Portable Mauve'Bib, In My Father's House, In His Room, And Especially Rummaging Through His Junk Drawer, and No More Princess Nice Guy: The Princess Serutan Diaries) lead off each chapter. Dune was a story about spice power; Doon is a story about beer power. Most notable is the successful transition of Herbert's style into comedy, as can be referenced by Pall Agamemnides as he surveys his situation prior to the relocation:

This realization focused within him in a sudden sparkflash computation, and in the clear brilliance of that illumination, the boy Pall understood a profoundness. His life, hitherto a child's plaything, devoid of direction–seemingly! Or had there in fact always been a plan–a plan within a plan within a plan (whatever that meant (whatever that meant (whatever that meant)))?–was now encompassed by a terrible purpose. He knew the meaning of the word terrible, and he knew the meaning of the word purpose. And therefore he understood deeply the meaning of "terrible purpose". Unless he, in the solitude of his deeply brain-filled mind, misunderstood this revelation, and was in fact confronted with a "terrible papoose."

What could that mean?

The native population of Doon, the Freedmenmen, are characterized as intense, somewhat overweight beer addicts, steeped in tradition, mysticism, and ritual, with a language of their own–"Varietese", a direct play on the signature style of headlinese of the entertainment-industry newspaper Variety (the magazine's famous headline, Sticks Nix Hick Pix, is rendered as an expression of resignation, along the lines of "What can one do?"). The stillsuit of the original story becomes the Freedmenmen sweatsuit, meant to induce sweating to reduce the accumulation of excess body weight brought on by constant beer consumption. The sandworms (also known as Maker and Shai-Hulud in the original) become giant pretzels, also known by the natives as Brewer and Schmai-gunug, a term the glossary claims is rendered from a Yiddish phrase meaning "to browse and fiddle around and window-shop enough".

An advertisement in the back of the book promised conceptual sequels, including Doon Meshugganah; Men, Women, Children, Pets of Doon; Lord God Help Us, Another Sequel to Doon; The Doon Reference Book, Atlas, and Rhyming Dictionary; and The Doon Catalogue of Quality Menswear for Dad 'n' Lad.

Characters

House Agamemnides and retainers 
 Duke Lotto Agamemnides, head of house
 Pall Agamemnides, son of Lotto and heir (or "shanana-Duke"), and Messiah (or "Mahdl-T") to the Freedmenmen
 Lady Jazzica, Boni Maroni adept, concubine of Duke Lotto
 Safire Halfwit, Mantan and Chief Character Assassin
 Gurnsey Halvah, House Agamemnides' troubadour-jester-torpedo
 Oyeah, Certified Imperial Accountant (and part-time stand-up comic) and traitor to House Agamemnides
 Drunken Omaha, Runner-with-Scissors
 Nailya-the-Truly-Weird, Daughter of Lotto and Jazzica

House Hardchargin, retainers and allies
 Baron Vladimir Hardchargin, head of house
 Filp-Rotha, shanana-Baron and heir
 Peter DeVries, Mantan

The Imperial House and allies 
 Shaddap IV, Pahdedbrah Emperor
 Serutan, princess and incessant author
 Revved-up Mother George Cynthia Mohairem, Boni Maroni truth-consequencer and tester of shanana-Duke Pall Agamemnides

Freedmenmen and others 
 Spilgard, Nabe (leader) of Hootch Grabr (a "Hootch" is a Freedmenmen settlement)
 Dr Keynes, Imperial Planetologist and liberal economist, Freedmenmen ally
 Loni, young Freedmenmen girl, Pall's concubine
 Caramello, Revved-Up Mother of the Freedmenmen of Hootch Grabr, who Jazzica succeeds.
 Janis, Freedmenmen Hootchmember whom Pall defeats in single insult-combat (rankout)
 Harrumf, Janis' wife, who becomes Pall's half-wife for a year after Janis' self-sacrifice post-rankout
 Great Big Houses, the holders of large planetary fiefs. These are mentioned in passing in the story, and include House Pancakes, House Seven Betty Grables, House Rising Sun, and House Dressing.
 The Schlepping Guild. Cognate of the Spacing Guild, the Schlepping Guild are characterized as beer-besotted long haul truckers who speak in a tongue not too different from that of the stereotypical truckers of the 1970s as seen in movies and television series popular at the time.

Reception
Dave Langford reviewed National Lampoon's Doon for White Dwarf #76, and stated that "with the best will in the world, a parody of a particular author gets tiresome after a few thousand words."

Reviews
Review by Dave Mead (1985) in Fantasy Review, February 1985
Review by Thomas G. Mahnken (1985) in Fantasy Review, February 1985
Review by Alma Jo Williams (1985) in Science Fiction Review, Summer 1985
Review by Robert Coulson (1985) in Amazing Stories, July 1985

See also

 Bored of the Rings

References

1984 American novels
American satirical novels
Books based on Dune (franchise)
Fantasy parodies
Doon
Parody novels